is a 2014 Japanese film directed by Teruyoshi Uchimura. Its English title is The Last Chance: Diary of Comedians.

Cast
 Atsushi Itō
 Keisuke Koide
 Nagasawa Masami

References

External links
 

2013 films
Films based on Japanese novels
2010s Japanese films

ja:ボクたちの交換日記